The 2021 Tamil Nadu Premier League, also known as (TNPL-5) or, for sponsorship reasons, Shriram Capital TNPL, was the fifth season of the Tamil Nadu Premier League (TNPL), a professional Twenty20 cricket league established by the Tamil Nadu Cricket Association (TNCA) in 2016 . It was scheduled from July 19 to August 15, 2021. The revised schedule was announced by TNCA on 7 July 2021 with all the matches played in Chennai. Chepauk Super Gillies were the defending champions from the 2019 edition of TNPL, while the 2020 edition was postponed and then cancelled due to COVID-19 pandemic.

On 6 August 2021, Chepauk Super Gillies became the first team to qualify to the playoffs after they beat Lyca Kovai Kings. Later, the following day, Dindigul Dragons became the second team, qualified to the playoffs, after their win over IDream Tiruppur Tamizhans. On 8 August 2021, the final day of League stage, Lyca Kovai Kings confirmed their playoffs spot, after beating Nellai Royal Kings. At the end of the league stage, Ruby Trichy Warriors who were finished on top of the table, also qualified for playoffs.

In the first qualifier, Ruby Trichy Warriors defeated the Chepauk Super Gillies to seat a place in the final. Dindigul Dragons through to the second qualifier, after they beat Lyca Kovai Kings in the eliminator match. On 13 August 2021, Chepauk Super Gillies defeated the Dindigul Dragons to face the Ruby Trichy Warriors in the final.

Defending champions Chepauk Super Gillies successfully retained their title with a 8 run win against Ruby Trichy Warriors in the final on 15 August 2021.

Background
Originally, the league was scheduled to take place from June 2021. In June 2021, the tournament was suspended for an indefinite amount of time due to ongoing COVID-19 pandemic and lockdown restrictions in Tamil Nadu. However, on 26 June 2021, the Board of Control for Cricket in India (BCCI) announced that the tournament would resume from July 2021. TNCA was planned to resume the tournament as they got the clearance from the state government. Subsequently, on 7 July 2021, TNCA got approval from the state government and announced the revised schedule.

Teams

Teams

There are eight franchises competing in league. The franchises are named after a district it is representing in the state. Each team can have a maximum of 22 players that includes two outstation players. In 2020, two of the franchises changed their names and bases – VB Kanchee Veerans now renamed as Nellai Royal Kings .

Venue 

A total of three venues were used until 2019. Grounds in Dindigul and Tirunelveli hosts every match in the league stages between them. Tournament were planned to start at Tirunelveli and finals to be held at Salem Cricket Foundation Stadium.

Two new venues in Salem and Coimbatore were slated to host matches from 2020 onwards. The ground in Coimbatore was expected to host matches in the fourth season itself. But TNCA wanted age-group tournaments held there first before TNPL. Initially, no matches were scheduled to play in Chennai venue for the season.

As per the revised schedule announced on 7 July 2021, all the matches were played at M. A. Chidambaram Stadium, Chennai.

Squads

Standings

Points table

  Advanced to the qualifiers
  Advanced  to the eliminator
  Eliminated from Tournament

League progression

 C - Champion
 RU - Runner-up

League stage

Source:

Fixtures

Playoffs

Preliminary

Qualifier 1

Eliminator

Qualifier 2

Final

References

External links
Series home at TNCA 
Series home at ESPN Cricinfo

Competitions
Tamil Nadu Premier League
2021 in Indian cricket
Cricket in Tamil Nadu